Mckeogh is an Irish surname.  Spelling variations include: MacKeogh, McKeough, Keogh Kehoe, McCaughey and Hoey, among others.  Modern spelling comes from the original Mac Eochaidh.

The McKeoghs are descendants of the ancient Dál Fiatach dynasty, rulers of the Ulaid. They trace their descent from Fiatach Finn mac Dáire, a King of Ulster and High King of Ireland in the 1st Century AD.

Notable people with the surname include:
 Aileen MacKeogh, the first director of Arthouse, a sculptor and academic in Ireland.
 Darcy McKeough, a Canadian businessman and politician.
 Dave McKeough, a Major League Baseball catcher in the late 1800s.
 Patrick McKeough, an investment publisher and editor.
 Raymond S. McKeough, a Democratic politician from Illinois.
 Rita McKeough, a Canadian artist.

Surnames of Irish origin
Anglicised Irish-language surnames